The 1920 South Norfolk by-election was a by-election held on 27 July 1920 for the British House of Commons constituency of South Norfolk.

Vacancy

The by-election was triggered by the succession to the peerage of the serving Coalition Liberal Member of Parliament (MP), William Cozens-Hardy.

Electoral history
South Norfolk had been a safe Liberal seat since Arthur Soames's victory in the 1898 by-election.

Candidates
The Liberal vote was now divided. The Coalition Liberal candidate was James Henley Batty, who received the support of the Coalition leaders, David Lloyd George and Bonar Law. He had contested the 1918 general election at Clitheroe, as a Coalition Liberal coming third behind Labour and Unionist. 

Charles Henry Roberts ran as a Liberal who received the support of H. H. Asquith. He had sat as a Liberal MP before the war. He was elected to Parliament for Lincoln in the 1906 general election and served under Asquith as Under-Secretary of State for India 1914 to 1915 and as Comptroller of the Household from 1915 to 1916. He lost his seat in 1918.

They were opposed by a strong Labour Party candidate, George Edwards, a former agricultural labourer. In 1906 he founded the Eastern Counties Agricultural Labourers & Small Holders Union later known as the National Union of Agricultural and Allied Workers, and became its general secretary. In 1906 he was elected to Norfolk County Council, in 1914 he became a magistrate, and in 1918 he became a county alderman. During the war he served on various committees and was given the OBE. He contested the South Norfolk constituency at the 1918 general election. He won 26% of the votes, losing to the Liberal Party candidate William Cozens-Hardy.

Campaign
Batty recommending those of his supporters who could not bring themselves to vote for the Coalition to support Edwards instead.  A local landowner and Norfolk county councillor, the Earl of Kimberley, endorsed Edwards.

Result 
The result was a clear win for Edwards, who picked up around 2,000 votes on a very similar turnout to the general election, and exploited the split in the Liberal vote.

Aftermath
Edwards was defeated in the next election, but won the seat again between 1923 and 1924.

References 

 The Times, 10 August 1920

See also 
 1898 South Norfolk by-election
 1955 South Norfolk by-election
 List of United Kingdom by-elections (1918–1931)
 South Norfolk constituency

South
1920 in England
1920 elections in the United Kingdom
20th century in Norfolk